The Södermanland archipelago is the archipelago of Södermanland County in Sweden.

It is located in the Baltic Sea and consists of 5,371 islands. The Södermanland archipelago is connected to the Stockholm archipelago in the north and to the Östergötland archipelago in the south.

References

External links 
 Harbors in the Södermanland archipelago (in Swedish)

Archipelagoes of Sweden
Landforms of Södermanland County